Internet in Estonia has one of the highest penetration rates in the world. In the first quarter of 2010, 75% out of 1.34 million people in the country used the Internet according to Statistics Estonia. In 2017, according to the World Bank came 13th in the world by the percentage of population using the Internet, with 88.1% people using it.

Facts and figures
 Top-level domain: .ee
 Internet users: 
 1.0 million users, 119th in the world; 79.0% of the population, 34th in the world (2012); 
 971,700 users, 102nd in the world (2009).
 Fixed broadband: 327,243 subscriptions, 78th in the world; 25.7% of the population, 31st in the world (2012).
 Wireless broadband: 924,699 subscriptions, 74th in the world; 72.5% of the population, 12th in the world (2012).
 Internet hosts: 865,494 hosts, 49th in the world (2012).
 IPv4: 1.3 million addresses allocated, less than 0.05% of the world total, 945.8 addresses per 1000 people (2012).

History

In 1965 the first school computer in the USSR, Ural-1, was set up in the town of Nõo. Mass usage of computing networks first came with FidoNet, the first Estonian node of which appeared in 1989. The first Internet connections in the country were introduced in 1992 at academic facilities in Tallinn and Tartu. The national domain (.ee) was registered in the middle of 1992. By virtue of its geographical location, the country played important role in transporting Internet culture to neighbouring Russia. One of the first backbone links for Russia was built in 1991 by Relcom through Estonia to Finland. In 1996 Estonian president Lennart Meri started the four-year state program "Tiigrihüpe" to computerize and internetize all of the country's schools.

The first public Wi-Fi area was launched in 2001 and a system of mobile data networks that enable widespread wireless broadband access has developed. In 2011, the country had over 2,440 free, certified Wi-Fi areas meant for public use, including at cafes, hotels, hospitals, schools, and gas stations. A countrywide wireless internet service based on CDMA technology has been deployed. Three mobile operators offer mobile 3G and 3.5G services, and as of May 2013, 4G services covered over 95 percent of the territory.

Computerization and digital connection for people are encouraged and supported by the state. The country has a digital ID card system, and in 2005 local elections were held with the official possibility to vote online – the first case of its kind in the world.

In 2008, the North Atlantic Treaty Organization (NATO) established a joint cyberdefense center in Estonia to improve cyberdefense interoperability and provide security support for all NATO members.

In 2009, the Estonian Internet Foundation was established to manage Estonia's top level domain, ".ee". As a multi-stakeholder organization it represents the Estonian Internet community internationally with respect to various Internet governance issues.

In 2013 there were over 200 operators offering electronic communications services, including six mobile phone companies and numerous Internet service providers. Voice over Internet Protocol (VoIP) services are widely available. Estonia has the largest functioning public-key infrastructure in Europe. All radio channels and TV productions, including news, of Estonian Public Broadcasting are available over the Internet in real time and archives of its radio and television programs are available at no charge.

The country's most popular search engine in Estonia is Google, although a not so common, but still existing alternative is the local Neti.ee.

Internet surveillance and filtering

Estonia was rated as "Free" in the 2009, 2011 to 2015 Freedom on the Net reports from Freedom House with overall scores of 13, 10, 10, 9, 8 and 7 (top 2 in the world in 2015) on a scale where 0 is best and 100 is worst. Estonia has not been individually classified by the OpenNet Initiative (ONI), but is included in the ONI's regional overview for the Commonwealth of Independent States.

Freedom of speech and freedom of expression are protected by Estonia's constitution and by the country's obligations as an EU member state. Anonymity is unrestricted, and there have been extensive public discussions on anonymity and the respectful use of the Internet. Work is underway to bring Estonian law into compliance with the European Council Framework on "combating certain forms and expressions of racism and xenophobia by means of criminal law".

Restrictions on Internet content and communications in Estonia are among the lightest in the world. ISPs and other communications companies are required to register with the Estonian Technical Surveillance Authority (ETSA), a branch of the Ministry of Economic Affairs and Communications, though there is no registration fee. Electronic communications companies are required to preserve traffic and location data for one year, as defined by the EU Data Retention Directive. They may only provide this data to surveillance agencies or security authorities when presented with a court order. A 2008 court case made web service providers responsible for reader comments, but that ruling is being appealed at the European Court of Human Rights. There have been instances of content removal involving civil court orders to remove inappropriate or off-topic reader comments from online news, discussion forums, and other sites. In 2012, over 80,000 videos were removed from YouTube and other streaming services for possible copyright infringement. The Personal Data Protection Act (PDPA) restricts the collection and public dissemination of an individual's personal data. No personal information that is considered sensitive—such as political opinions, religious or philosophical beliefs, ethnic or racial origin, sexual behavior, health, or criminal convictions—can be processed without the consent of the individual.

Prior to the blocking of remote gambling sites in 2010 the Internet in Estonia was free of censorship. Early in 2010 Estonia started DNS filtering of remote gambling sites that violate the renewed Gambling Act (2008). The Gambling Act requires that servers for legal remote gambling must be physically located in Estonia. In March 2010 the Tax and Customs Board had compiled a blocking list containing 175 sites which ISPs are to enforce. As of September 2013 the list had grown to include over 800 sites.

See also
 Communications in Estonia

References

Further reading

 Farivar, Cyrus. 2011. The Internet of Elsewhere: the Emergent Effects of a Wired World. New Brunswick, N.J.: Rutgers University Press. pp. 109–149. Covers the history of the Internet and public WiFi access in Estonia.

 
Estonia